Crazy P (formerly known as Crazy Penis) is an English electronic music group, formed around 1995 by Chris Todd and Jim Baron.

History
Todd and Baron formed the band after meeting at the University of Nottingham. The band's sound incorporates soul music, disco and house music. By 2002 the band expanded to include bassist Tim Davies, percussionist Mav Kendricks, and vocalist Danielle Moore. Todd explained the origin of the band name: "A flat mate of mine had a record called 'loco pinga' which roughly translates to Crazy Penis, we were going to call ourselves loco pinga but once we told people that, they liked crazy penis better for the shock value."

They were signed by Manchester label Paper Recordings and have since released six albums and several singles, starting with "Digging Deeper" in 1996. They built up a strong fanbase in Australia where they have toured several times.

Their track "There's a Better Place" samples the song "Pure Imagination" from the movie Willy Wonka & the Chocolate Factory.

Their track "Stop Space Return" was released as iTunes UK's single of the week on 28 October 2008.

The band began using 'Crazy P' exclusively in 2008 with Moore explaining "We wanted to grow, and keep growing, so there was no point in cutting our nose off to spite our face by keeping the original name."

Discography

Studio albums
 A Nice Hot Bath With... (1998)
 The Wicked is Music (2002)
 24 Hour Psychedelic Freakout (2003)
 A Night on Earth (2005)
 Stop Space Return / Love on the Line (in Australia) (2008)
 When We On (2011)
 Walk Dance Talk Sing (2015)
 Age of the Ego (2019)

Live albums
 When We Live (2012)

Remix albums
 A Nice Hot Edit With..... (2011)
 Remixed (2013)

Remixes
Hot Toddy remixes

References

External links

English electronic music groups
Musical groups from Nottingham